Meinam Bhorot Singh is an Indian politician and member of the Bharatiya Janata Party. Singh is a former member of the Manipur Legislative Assembly from the Thangmeiband  constituency in Imphal West district.

References 

People from Imphal West district
Bharatiya Janata Party politicians from Manipur
Manipur MLAs 2002–2007
Living people
Manipur politicians
21st-century Indian politicians
Year of birth missing (living people)